Orlov Dol is a village in the municipality of Topolovgrad, in Haskovo Province, in southern Bulgaria.

History
The village's previous name was Minchevo.

In the nineteenth century, the Bulgarian revolutionary Vasil Levski allegedly visited the village thrice, in 1870, 1871, and 1872.

References

Villages in Haskovo Province